Chaoyang Park is a park located on the site of the former Prince's Palace in Beijing's Chaoyang District.

The park's construction began in 1984 and it became Beijing's largest park. It is approximately 2.8 km in length and approximately 1.5 km in width. It has a total area of 288.7 hectares, and a water surface area of 68.2 hectares. The majority of land in the park is used as green space.

It features flower gardens, fairground with rides, activities such as laser tag and a high ropes course, a roller coaster, landscaped areas and several large swimming pools. Bicycles and boats may also be hired at various locations in the park.

Events

Since 2005, the Beijing Pop Festival, featuring Chinese and international musical acts, has been held at Chaoyang Park each September.

A temporary beach volleyball stadium was constructed at Chaoyang Park to host the beach volleyball events of the 2008 Summer Olympics, using sand shipped in from Hainan island.

Artworks
 Non-Violence (sculpture)

References

External links

Chaoyang Park official site (Chinese)
ChaoYang Park, Beijing : a photographic guide

1984 establishments in China
Chaoyang District, Beijing
Parks in Beijing